Partido Alto is a Brazilian telenovela produced and broadcast by TV Globo. It premiered on 7 May 1984 and ended on 23 November 1984, with a total of 173 episodes. It's the thirty-second "novela das oito" to be aired on the timeslot. It is created and written by Aguinaldo Silva with Glória Perez and directed by Roberto Talma, Jorge Fernando and Guel Arraes.

Cast

References

External links 
 

TV Globo telenovelas
1984 telenovelas
Brazilian telenovelas
1984 Brazilian television series debuts
1984 Brazilian television series endings
Telenovelas by Glória Perez
Portuguese-language telenovelas